Lars Konstantin Eckenrode (born March 24, 1995) is an American retired professional soccer.

Career

College & Youth 
Eckenrode grew up in West Springfield, Virginia and played soccer for the West Springfield Spartans. After a decorated club and high school career, he attended the University of Michigan for four years, where he played for the Wolverines. Scoring once in 68 appearances, while also recording 2 assists, he was named to the Big Ten All-Rookie Team in 2013 and College Sports Madness Preseason All-Big Ten Team in 2014.

During his time in college, Eckenrode also spent time with National Premier Soccer League sides D.C. United U-23 and AFC Ann Arbor.

Professional 
Eckenrode was drafted in the fourth round, 83rd overall, in the 2017 MLS SuperDraft by Toronto FC on January 17, 2017. He signed with United Soccer League side Toronto FC II on March 16, 2017. Eckenrode made his professional debut on March 25, 2017, in a 1-0 victory over Phoenix Rising. He missed the majority of the 2017 season as he was rehabbing from an injury. On March 23, 2018, Toronto FC II re-signed Eckenrode.

On December 11, 2018, Eckenrode signed with Tormenta FC of the newly founded USL League One. He scored his first professional goal on April 14, 2019 in a 1–1 draw with Orlando City B.

Eckenrode retired following the 2022 USL League One season and joined the Tormenta front office as Coordinator of Special Projects.

References

External links
 
 

1995 births
Living people
American soccer players
American expatriate soccer players
Association football defenders
AFC Ann Arbor players
D.C. United U-23 players
Michigan Wolverines men's soccer players
National Premier Soccer League players
People from West Springfield, Virginia
Soccer players from Virginia
Sportspeople from Fairfax County, Virginia
Tormenta FC players
Toronto FC II players
Toronto FC draft picks
USL Championship players
USL League One players
Expatriate soccer players in Canada
American expatriate sportspeople in Canada
League1 Ontario players